The Ganda Singhwala railway station is a railway station located in Kasur District, Punjab, Pakistan.

See also
 List of railway stations in Pakistan
 Pakistan Railways

References

External links

Railway stations in Kasur District